Carlos Will Mejía García (born September 29, 1983) is a Honduran footballer who most recently played as a midfielder for Olimpia in the Liga Nacional de Honduras.

Club career
Nicknamed Garrincha, Mejía started his professional career at Platense and also played for Marathón, while still on the books of Platense, before joining Olimpia before the 2011 Apertura.

International career
A rightsided winger, Mejía made his debut for Honduras in a February 2007 UNCAF Nations Cup match against Nicaragua in which  m he immediately scored a goal, and has, as of January 2013, earned a total of 14 caps, scoring 1 goal. He has represented his country in 3 FIFA World Cup qualification matches and played at the 2007 and 2009 UNCAF Nations Cups as well as at the 2009 CONCACAF Gold Cup.

International goals

|}

Personal life
His mother is a niece of former national team midfielder Prudencio Norales. Mejía is married and has three daughters: Suyapa, Allison and Reina.

References

External links

 Profile – CD Marathón
 Profile – Diez

1983 births
Living people
People from Cortés Department
Association football midfielders
Honduran footballers
Honduras international footballers
2007 UNCAF Nations Cup players
2009 UNCAF Nations Cup players
2009 CONCACAF Gold Cup players
2014 Copa Centroamericana players
Platense F.C. players
C.D. Marathón players
C.D. Olimpia players
Liga Nacional de Fútbol Profesional de Honduras players